Martyn Bennett (born 4 August 1961) is an English former professional footballer who played as a defender.

A product of local junior football and a schoolboy international for England, Bennett was signed by West Bromwich Albion who saw him as a future replacement for veteran Ally Robertson. He made his debut against Everton in 1979 and established himself as a first-teamer the following year, although, with the exception of the 1984–85 season, his progress was hampered by a series of injuries. Having played for England U-21s and England B, Bennett was called into the England squad a few times without playing, Bennett managed just 18 starts for Albion between 1986 and 1990, playing his final game for the club in 1989 in a 7–0 win over Barnsley. After his injuries became too much for top-flight football, Bennett left Albion in 1990 to sign for Worcester City, becoming player-manager, then manager.

References

1961 births
Living people
English footballers
English football managers
West Bromwich Albion F.C. players
Worcester City F.C. players
Worcester City F.C. managers
Footballers from Birmingham, West Midlands
Association football central defenders